Duncan Brannan (born June 25, 1970) is an American voice actor, who has provided voices for numerous mainstream children's entertainment characters, English-language dubs of Japanese anime, and other commercial properties.

Career 
Brannan was the voice of Chuck E. Cheese in restaurant chains across the U.S., as well as his English and Spanish voice in national commercials seen on PBS, Nickelodeon, and other places from January 1993 to April 2012. He was replaced by musician and singer Jaret Reddick when Chuck E. Cheese’s revamped their image. Brannan is also known for his work on the children's TV series Barney & Friends from 1997 to 2002, providing Barney's character and singing voice for home video releases, his singing voice for the PBS series following Bob West’s (who's also done voices of Chuck E Cheese characters) departure, fill-in and replacement, as well as Barney’s voice for numerous public relations spots on radio and television and merchandise from plush toys to games, compact discs, and more. Ironically, Chuck E. Cheese was a sponsor to Barney & Friends at the time as well as other PBS programs such as Arthur and Clifford the Big Red Dog.

Brannan has also voiced commercials and industrials for secular and religious markets. Some of his most notable credits are: Taco Bueno, Martha Stewart, Just Brakes, The Department of Defense, Brinker's International (for Chili's, Maggiano's, On the Border, and Romano's Macaroni Grill), Methodist Health Systems, Leslie's Pool Supplies, Cambien Voyager, New Horizons, Stop Her Now, K Havnanian Homes, First United Bank, Campus Crusade for Christ, Chuck Swindoll, Lone Star College System, Parkland Health and Hospital Systems, JPI Realtors, the National Rifle Association's Eddie Eagle & the Wing Team, Okratron 5000, and Funimation, Inc.

In April 2020, Brannan landed the voice of “Beasley,” the new public relations canine mascot for the city of Easley, South Carolina.

Outside of voice acting, Brannan also works as a writer, artist, consultant, and pastor.

Personal life 
He currently resides in Fort Worth, Texas with his wife Ralana Lynn Gregg, whom he married on January 2, 1993. Together they have two daughters, Kaydra and Karlisa Brannan.

Filmography

Barney & Friends 
 2000:
Season 7
 Come On Over to Barney's House (August 15th)
 Magical Music (Early September)
 On Location: All Around Town (Early September)
 Dino Dancin' Tunes (September 5th)
Macy's Thanksgiving Day Parade (2000)
 2002:
Season 7
 Barney's Christmas Star (Barney's UK Zoo Tour 2002) (November 6th)

As a Fill-in for the 2nd Generation 
 1997:
Season 3 (GMTV Version)
 Promotional Spots (July – December)
Season 4 (November 20-28th)
 1998:
Season 4
 It's Time for Counting (January 13th)
 Barney's Great Adventure (April 8th (at the La Brea Tar Pits in Los Angeles, CA))
 My Party with Barney (April 10th)
 PBS Kids Promotional Spots (November 1998 - 1999)
Season 6
 Season 6 Promos
 More Barney Songs (December 28th)
Macy's Thanksgiving Day Parade (1999)
 Early 2000s:
Season 6 (home videos only)
 Barney at Alton Towers (April 1, 2000 – Late 2002)

Film

Anime

Video games

Other Work

References

External links 
 
 
 

Living people
American male voice actors
People from Fort Worth, Texas
American Christian religious leaders
1970 births
21st-century American male singers
21st-century American singers